Khamsay Souphanouvong was a Laotian politician and was a member of the Lao People's Revolutionary Party (LPRP). He was born in 1943 and is the son of Souphanouvong, the former head of state. He served as Minister of Finance.

He was elected to the LPRP Central Committee at the 5th National Congress and sat for one term.

References

Specific

Bibliography
Books:
 

Living people
1943 births
Alternate members of the 4th Central Committee of the Lao People's Revolutionary Party
Members of the 5th Central Committee of the Lao People's Revolutionary Party
Finance Ministers of Laos
Government ministers of Laos
Lao People's Revolutionary Party politicians
Place of birth missing (living people)